The  Little League World Series took place between August 21 and August 25 in Williamsport, Pennsylvania. The Tainan City Little League of Tainan City, Taiwan, defeated the Cactus Little League of Tucson, Arizona, in the championship game of the 27th Little League World Series.

The champions from Taiwan did not allow a run or a hit in the entire tournament, registering no hitters in each of their three tournament games. That feat has yet to be equalled in any other Little League World Series.

Teams

Winners Bracket

Consolation Bracket

Notable players
 Ed Vosberg (Tucson, Arizona) - Won a College World Series Championship with the University of Arizona in 1980 and an MLB World Series title with the Florida Marlins in 1997. Pitched 10 seasons in the MLB for the San Diego Padres, San Francisco Giants, Oakland Athletics, Texas Rangers, Marlins, Arizona Diamondbacks, Philadelphia Phillies, and Montreal Expos between 1986 and 2002.
 George Crum (Tampa, Florida) - Drafted in the 23rd Round of the 1980 MLB Draft by the Texas Rangers.  Played 7 seasons in the minor leagues.
 Dwight Gooden (Tampa, Florida) was an integral part of the team that qualified for the LLWS but at 9 years old was too young to play at Williamsport.

References

External links
1973 Little League World Series
Line scores for the 1973 LLWS

Little League World Series
Little League World Series
Little League World Series